Baby corn (also known as young corn, cornlets or baby sweetcorn) is a cereal grain taken from corn (maize) harvested early while the stalks are still small and immature. It typically is eaten whole—including the cob, which is otherwise too tough for human consumption in mature corn—in raw, pickled, and cooked forms. Baby corn is common in stir fry dishes.

Production methods 
There are two methods for producing baby corn: either as a primary crop, or as a secondary crop in a planting of sweet corn or field corn. In the first method, a seed variety is chosen and planted to produce only baby corn. Many varieties are suitable, but those developed specifically for baby corn tend to produce more ears per plant. In the second production method, the variety is selected to produce sweet or field corn. The second ear from the top of the plant is harvested for baby corn, while the top ear
is allowed to mature.

Baby corn ears are hand-picked as soon as the corn silks emerge from the ear tips, or a few days after. Corn generally matures very quickly, so the harvest of baby corn must be timed carefully to avoid ending up with more mature corn ears.

Uses 

Baby corn is consumed worldwide.

Baby corn forage can also be fed fresh or ensiled to livestock animals.

References

External links 
 What is Baby Corn? Pamphlet From Washington State University

Maize varieties
Miniature versions of vegetables